Emre Kahraman (born 23 June 1987 in Trabzon) is a Turkish football player who currently plays for Araklıspor.

Career
The midfielder played previously for Trabzonspor, 1461 Trabzon, Linyit Spor and IDCspor.

References

External links

1987 births
Living people
Turkish footballers
Association football midfielders
1461 Trabzon footballers
Nazilli Belediyespor footballers
Arsinspor footballers
TKİ Tavşanlı Linyitspor footballers